Meridemis subbathymorpha is a species of moth of the family Tortricidae. It is found in India (Jammu and Kashmir).

The ground colour of the forewings is cream, suffused with brownish. The markings are brownish, tinged with grey and marked with black strigulae in the costal parts. The hindwings are brownish cream.

References

External links

Moths described in 2006
Moths of Asia
Archipini
Taxa named by Józef Razowski